The Central Motorway Police Group (CMPG) is a co-operative operation between two police forces in the West Midlands of England. Officers from the two forces involved – Staffordshire Police, and West Midlands Police – provide a dedicated policing service on several hundred miles of the motorway network in the Staffordshire and West Midlands police areas. Previously the group also included West Mercia Police and Warwickshire Police.

The radio control room is based at Quinton working with National Highways, 
and central vehicle depot is located adjacent to the M6 at Perry Barr in Birmingham where Thornbridge Avenue passes under the motorway. The depot has direct access onto both the northbound and southbound carriageways of the motorway allowing police vehicles to respond faster to incidents.

In June 2008, police forces in North West England established the North West Motorway Police Group covering the motorways in their respective areas following the success of the CMPG.

History
Staffordshire Police and Warwickshire Police joined the partnership in 2001, bringing the motorway sections in those counties within the Group's area of responsibility, while West Mercia increased its input.

Warwickshire withdrew from the CMPG in April 2007 and West Mercia announced their intention to withdraw in July 2017, partly due to the Strategic Alliance they have with Warwickshire.
West Mercia Police withdrew from CMPG in April 2018.

See also 
 Road Policing Unit

References

External links
 Official Website

Motorway police units of the United Kingdom
1990 establishments in England
Organizations established in 1990